Fan Di'an (born September 1955) is a Chinese painter currently serving as president of the Central Academy of Fine Arts and China Artists Association.

Biography
Fan was born in Fujian in September 1955. He secondary studied at Pucheng County No.1 High School. During the late Cultural Revolution, he was a sent down youth between 1973 and 1977. After the resumption of college entrance examination in 1977, he was accepted to the Fujian Normal University. After graduation, he taught at the university. He joined the Communist Party of China in April 1979. In 1985, he was admitted to Central Academy of Fine Arts, and worked at the university since 1988. He was a visiting scholar at the University of Victoria from 1992 to 1993. In 2005, he was appointed president of the National Art Museum of China. After this office was terminated in 2014, he became president of the Central Academy of Fine Arts. In December 2018, he was elected president of the China Artists Association.

He was a member of the 11th, 12th, 13th National Committee of the Chinese People's Political Consultative Conference.

References

External links
Biography of Fan Di'an Central Academy of Fine Arts
Biography of Fan Di'an US–China Forum on the Arts and Culture

1955 births
Living people
People from Nanping
Fujian Normal University alumni
Central Academy of Fine Arts alumni
People's Republic of China painters
Members of the 11th Chinese People's Political Consultative Conference
Members of the 12th Chinese People's Political Consultative Conference
Members of the 13th Chinese People's Political Consultative Conference